Sansais is a commune in the Deux-Sèvres department and Nouvelle-Aquitaine region of western France.

It is twinned with the municipality of Crisnée, Wallonia in Belgium.

See also
Communes of the Deux-Sèvres department

References

Communes of Deux-Sèvres